Wolfgang Pfeifer  (born July 3, 1935) is a German former footballer.

He won two caps for the East Germany national team at the end of the 1950s.

In the East German top division he appeared 287 times.

References

External links 
 
 
 

1935 births
Living people
German footballers
East German footballers
East Germany international footballers
Dresdner SC players
Dynamo Dresden players
DDR-Oberliga players
Association football defenders